Chivemla is a village in Suryapet district of the Indian state of Telangana. It is located Chivvemla mandal of Suryapet division.

References 

Mandal headquarters in Suryapet district
Villages in Suryapet district